Arses, also known by his regnal name Artaxerxes IV, was the twelfth Achaemenid King of Kings from 338 to 336 BC. 

Arses ascended the throne, after his father Artaxerxes III—who had caused a resurgence of the Persian Empire—was poisoned by the eunuch Bagoas. The latter put Arses on the throne with the expectation of being able to control him. With the weakening of the Achaemenid Empire from the assassination of Artaxerxes III and the succession of Arses, the Greek league sent troops into Asia in 336.

Arses, in an attempt to free himself from Bagoas' influences, tried to have the eunuch poisoned; but did not succeed, instead succumbing to poison himself at the orders of Bagoas. Bagoas put Arses' cousin Darius III on the throne after him.

Name

The term is linguistically related to Greek , meaning "male, manly".

Biography 
Arses was the youngest son of Artaxerxes III and his wife Atossa. Arses had several brothers, only one whose name is attested, a certain Bisthanes. Persia was experiencing a resurgence under Artaxerxes III, who reorganized his empire, and suppressed revolts throughout the country. However, the fortunes of Persia came to an abrupt end in autumn of 338, when Artaxerxes III was murdered by the ambitious eunuch and chiliarch Bagoas, who had the king poisoned. Artaxerxes III's early death proved to be a problematic issue for Persia, and may have played a role in the weakening of the country. The majority of Artaxerxes III's sons, with the exception of Arses and Bisthanes, were also murdered by Bagoas. Bagoas, who wanted to be kingmaker, put the young Arses on the throne.

On his ascension to the throne, Arses most likely assumed the regnal name of Artaxerxes IV. He was put on the throne by Bagoas due to his youth, which the latter sought to take advantage of in order to control him. Around the same period, most of the Greek city-states had joined the Greek league under the leadership of the Macedonian king Philip II, who took advantage of the events in Persia by demanding compensation from the country for helping the town of Perinthus during the reign of Artaxerxes III. Arses declined, and as a result, a Greek expedition was started with Philip II as general, who sent 10,000 Macedonian soldiers into Asia in 336 BC. At the same time, however, Arses was determined on trying to free himself from Bagoas' authority and influence; he made an unsuccessful effort to have the latter poisoned, only to be poisoned himself along with the rest of his family by Bagoas, who put Arses' cousin Darius III on the throne. Macedonian propaganda, made in order to legitimize the conquests of Alexander the Great a few years later, accused Darius III of playing a key role in the murder of Arses, who was portrayed as the last king of the Achaemenid royal house.

Coinage

There is no dynastic coinage of Artaxerxes IV, but it is thought he may be depicted as a young ruler wearing the Pharaonic crown on the reverse of some of the contemporary coinage of satrap Mazaios in Cilicia, while his father Artaxerxes III appears seated, also in Pharaonic dress, on the obverse.

References

Bibliography

Ancient works 
Arrian, The Anabasis of Alexander.
Diodorus Siculus, Bibliotheca historica.
Justin, Epitome of the Philippic History of Pompeius Trogus.

Modern works 
 
 
 
 

4th-century BC Kings of the Achaemenid Empire
4th-century BC Pharaohs
4th-century BC Babylonian kings
Kings of the Achaemenid Empire
Pharaohs of the Achaemenid dynasty of Egypt
Thirty-first Dynasty of Egypt
336 BC deaths
4th-century BC murdered monarchs
Murdered Persian monarchs
Deaths by poisoning
Year of birth unknown
4th-century BC Iranian people
4th-century BC rulers